The Revolutionary Communist Party was a minor naxalite faction that merged with Centre of Communist Revolutionaries of India in 1988. It was based in Punjab. RCP was led by Takra.

Defunct communist parties in India
Political parties with year of establishment missing
Political parties disestablished in 1988
1988 disestablishments in India
Naxalite–Maoist insurgency